Michael James Jackson (27 March 1942 – 30 August 2007) was an English writer and journalist. He was the author of many influential books about beer and whisky. He was a regular contributor to a number of British broadsheets, particularly The Independent and The Observer.

Jackson's books have sold over three million copies worldwide and have been translated into eighteen languages. He is credited with helping to start a renaissance of interest in beer and breweries worldwide in the 1970s, particularly in the United States. He is also widely credited with popularising the idea of beer styles. His influential television series The Beer Hunter was shown in fifteen countries.

He was as well-versed in malt whisky as he was in beer, and his book Michael Jackson's Malt Whisky Companion (1989) is the best-selling book on the subject in the world.

At the time of his death Jackson had been suffering from Parkinson's disease for at least a decade. He did not declare his illness until his symptoms caused some to think he was drunk.

Life
Jackson was born in Wetherby, West Riding of Yorkshire. His father had Anglicised his Lithuanian Jewish surname Jakowitz to Jackson. The family moved to Leeds after the war. He went to King James's Grammar School, Almondbury and became a journalist, particularly being associated with Edinburgh, where he first encountered whisky. On his return to London he briefly edited the advertising trade journal Campaign.

Michael Jackson became known in beer circles in 1977 when his book The World Guide To Beer was first published. This was later translated into more than ten languages and is still considered to be one of the most fundamental books on the subject. The modern theory of beer style is largely derived from this book, in which Jackson categorised a variety of beers from around the world in local style groups suggested by local customs and names.

His work had a special influence on the popularisation of the brewing culture in North America, and in 1989 he hosted a television series entitled The Beer Hunter, which was shown on Channel 4 in the UK and the Discovery Channel. It involved several episodes in which Jackson would visit a different country. Episodes featured beer barrels being lined with pitch or iron foundry workers drinking 'light' beer while they worked in hot conditions to quench thirst, practices which he knew were likely to be ended soon.

Jackson considered beer as a component of culture and described beers in their cultural context. Although he travelled around the world and discovered different beer cultures, he was especially fond of the Belgian beers. He was appointed to an honorary officer of the Ridderschap van de Roerstok in 1997 for his important contribution to the international success of the Belgian beers. This honour had previously only been given to brewers. In 1998, Jackson brought forth his own line of beer glassware. Shortly after, Jackson also helped create and worked with the only beer club he ever endorsed, Michael Jackson's Rare Beer Club.

Jackson was also an important reviewer of whiskies. In his book The Malt Whisky Companion, he reviewed a large number of whiskies and gave them marks from 0–100, considering only those with a score above seventy-five worth purchasing.
In many ways, his work in the world of whisky exceeded his significance as a beer writer. He was arguably the most important writer on whisky since the Victorian commentator Alfred Barnard and certainly the most significant and influential modern whisky writer.
This was recognised by the award of "Master of the Quaich" and the prodigious sale of his whisky books and sell-out attendances at his tastings. He had a large influence on the development of single malt whisky globally.

Apart from his work as a journalist and a critic, he was also a fan of rugby league.

It was revealed in December 2006 that Jackson had been suffering for at least a decade from Parkinson's disease. He also suffered from diabetes. Michael Jackson died of a heart attack in his home on the morning of 30 August 2007 at the age of 65. He was survived by his girlfriend of 26 years, Paddy Gunningham, and her daughter and grandchildren.

Awards
André Simon Award
Winner of the Glenfiddich Trophy, a British prize for culinary writers.
Honorary officer of the Ridderschap van de Roerstok, a Belgian award.
The Gold Tankard of the British Guild of Beer Writers, given for his CD-Roms
Columnist of the Year from the North American Guild of Beer Writers
Winner James Beard Award, 2006
 Keeper of the Quaich; Master of the Quaich (Scotch Whisky industry award)
 Holder of the Haarikka ("haarikanhaltija" in Finnish) 1995 (Finnish Sahti Association award)
First recipient of the US Achievement Award of the Institute for Fermentation Studies.
Honorary Master beer judge; Beer Judge Certification Program (BJCP)

Selective bibliography
 Jackson, Michael (1976). The English Pub
 Jackson, Michael (1977). The World Guide to Beer
 Jackson, Michael (1986). Pocket Guide to Beer 
 Jackson, Michael (1987). The World Guide to Whisky
 Jackson, Michael (1988). New World Guide to Beer (Updated)
 Jackson, Michael (1991). Michael Jackson's Great Beers of Belgium 
 Jackson, Michael (1997). Michael Jackson's Beer Companion 
 Jackson, Michael (1998) Ultimate Beer
 Jackson, Michael (1998) Little Book on Beer
 Jackson, Michael; Lucas, Sharon (ed.) (1999).  Michael Jackson's complete guide to Single Malt Scotch (fourth ed.).  Philadelphia, Pennsylvania:  Running Press Book Publishers.  
 Jackson, Michael; Lucas, Sharon (ed.) (2000).  Michael Jackson's Great Beer Guide.  DK ADULT.  
 Jackson, Michael (2001). Scotland and its Whiskies
 Jackson, Michael (2004). The Malt Whisky Companion, Penguin Books 2004 
 Jackson, Michael (2005). Bar and Cocktail Party Book
 Jackson, Michael (2005). Whisky

Multimedia
 The Beer Hunter (1989), a set of two VHS videocassettes
 A Journey of Discovery – Tasting the Classic Malts with Michael Jackson (1992), a VHS videocassette
 The Beer Hunter (1995), a CD-ROM about the American beer culture
 World Beer Hunter (1996), a CD-ROM on beer cultures around the world
 Beer Hunter The Movie (2013), a documentary film on Michael's life

See also
 Jim Murray (whisky writer)

References

External links
Michael Jackson Special Collection This is held in the Oxford Brookes University Library and includes 1,500 books from the expert's personal library on beer, whisky and other drinks, as well as 300 copies of his own books.
 Michael Jackson's Beer Hunter
Obituary, "The Guardian", 4 September 2007 (written by Roger Protz)
 Obituary, Washington Post, 1 September 2007
Obituary, The Daily Telegraph, 1 September 2007
Obituary, The Independent, 3 September 2007
 Obituary, The Times, 5 September 2007
'Lives Remembered' The Times
Remembering Michael Jackson, The Brewers Association
 Michael Jackson's Life and Death, All about Beer
'Michael Jackson's Rare Beer Club'
Michael Jackson – special issue of Brewery History
http://www.beerhuntermovie.com/about_the_film.php
https://www.kickstarter.com/projects/wandermedia/beer-hunter-the-movie/description

1942 births
2007 deaths
Beer writers
Whisky writers
English columnists
English food writers
English male journalists
English people of Lithuanian-Jewish descent
People educated at King James's School, Almondbury
People from Wetherby